Giussani may refer to:
 Bruno Giussani: Swiss writer.
 Luigi Giussani: Italian priest and founder of Communion and Liberation.
 Angela and Luciana Giussani, who created the famous comics character Diabolik.